LIVRE (L), previously known as LIVRE/Tempo de Avançar (L/TDA), is a green political party in Portugal founded in 2014.

Its founding principles are ecology, universalism, freedom, equity, solidarity, socialism and Europeanism. Its symbol is a poppy.

It was legalised by the Portuguese Constitutional Court on 20 March 2014. On 20 May 2015, it officially changed its name LIVRE to LIVRE/Tempo de Avançar, with L/TDA as its abbreviation. It switched back to its original name a few years later.

Political stances
One of the main points of the party's manifesto going into the 2022 Portuguese legislative election was support for a universal basic income. The party also highlighted its support for increasing the national minimum wage to €1,000 per month, extending support for: remote working, pregnant workers, workers with health problems, caregivers and supporting "micro-businesses". The party also supports a Green New Deal for Portugal, lowering VAT from 23% to 6% on vets and pet food, banning bullfighting and legalising cannabis.

Electoral results

Assembly of the Republic

European Parliament

Parishes

References

External links 
 

2014 establishments in Portugal
Political parties established in 2014
Democratic socialist parties in Europe
Ecosocialist parties
Green parties in Europe
Political parties in Portugal
Socialist parties in Portugal
Pro-European political parties in Portugal
Political parties supporting universal basic income